The second season of the television drama series Winners & Losers aired from 26 June to 27 November 2012 on the Seven Network in Australia. It replaced Packed to the Rafters while the series was on hiatus. Season two follows the lives of Jenny, Bec, Sophie and Frances three months on from the events of the first season. Filming for the season began in August 2011 and creator of the show, Bevan Lee stated that viewers would see big changes for the girls. The main cast members all returned, while Anne Phelan joined them as Gross family matriarch Nanna Dot.

Production
On 5 July 2011, it was announced that Seven had renewed Winners & Losers for a second season to air in 2012. Filming for the second season began on 23 August 2011 and completed on 5 April 2012. Bevan Lee, the creator of Winners & Losers, told the Herald Sun's Colin Vickery that viewers would see big changes in the new season. He said "We turn the girls' lives on their heads in a pretty major way in the final episode (of series one). That will give us a new launching pad for season two." Zoe Tuckwell-Smith told a TV Week reporter that the new season would see the girls get different individual storylines. Tuckwell-Smith added that she had filmed limited scenes with Melissa Bergland, who plays Bec's best friend, Jenny. Of her character's journey, Bergland revealed "Jenny is falling in love and getting everything she ever wanted ... and then ruining her life! She's doing everything in two years that everyone else has done over 10. She's 28 next season, and she's catching up." The actress commented that Winners & Losers felt like it had grown up a bit. The season began airing on 26 June 2012 in the 8:30 pm timeslot on Tuesdays.

Cast

Main 
 Melissa Bergland as Jenny Gross
 Virginia Gay as Frances James
 Zoe Tuckwell-Smith as Bec O'Connor
 Melanie Vallejo as Sophie Wong
 Damien Bodie as Jonathan Kurtiss (20 episodes)
 Blair McDonough as Matt O'Connor
 Stephen Phillips as Zach Armstrong (19 episodes)
 Tom Wren as Doug Graham
 Denise Scott as Trish Gross
 Francis Greenslade as Brian Gross
 Sarah Grace as Bridget Fitzpatrick (16 episodes)
 Jack Pearson as Patrick Gross
 Tom Hobbs as Flynn Johnson (7 episodes)

Recurring 
 Anne Phelan as Dot Gross (17 episodes)
 PiaGrace Moon as Jasmine Patterson (16 episodes)
 Paul Moore as Wes Fitzpatrick (15 episodes)
 Mike Smith as Callum Gilbert (12 episodes)
 Michala Banas as Tiffany Turner (11 episodes)
 Nick Simpson-Deeks as Rhys Mitchell (10 episodes)
 Peta Sergeant as Cat Johnson (8 episodes)
 Nell Feeney as Carolyn Gilbert (6 episodes)
 Carmen Duncan as Prof. Kerry Green (6 episodes)
 Luke Arnold as Lachie Clarke (6 episodes)
 Matt Levett as Spencer Campbell (5 episodes)
 Andrew Blackman as Tom Shields (5 episodes)
 Lara Robinson as Tilly Young (5 episodes)

Guest 
 Natalie Saleeba as Claire Armstrong (4 episodes)
 Thomas Lacey as Ollie Masters (4 episodes)
 Greg Stone as Steve Gilbert (3 episodes)
 Julie Forsyth as Marjorie Felton (3 episodes)
 Brett Cousins as Glenn Young (3 episodes)
 Katherine Hicks as Sam MacKenzie (3 episodes)
 Maya Aleksandra as Brandi Bower (2 episodes)
 Luke Hemsworth as Jackson Norton (2 episodes)
 Carolyn Bock as Louise Wong (2 episodes)
 Lawrence Mooney as Trevor Myers (1 episode)
 Judith McGrath as Maria Crawley (1 episode)
 Julie Nihill as Pauline Brown (1 episode)
 Ross Thompson as Keith Boland (1 episode)
 Peter Houghton as Max Masters (1 episode)
 Ben Anderson as Terry Carlisle (1 episode)

Casting
Returning supporting cast members included Michala Banas as Tiffany Turner, PiaGrace Moon as Jasmine Patterson, Natalie Saleeba as Claire Armstrong, Mike Smith as Bec's brother Callum Gilbert and Nell Feeney as their mother Carolyn Gilbert. Nick Simpson-Deeks reprised his role as Rhys Mitchell for ten episodes.

In April 2012, Erin McWhirter of TV Week announced Luke Hemsworth would be appearing in at least two episodes. On 7 July 2012, a writer for The Advertiser revealed that Maya Aleksandra had joined the guest cast as Brandi Bower, a character who is engaged to Steve Gilbert (Greg Stone). Luke Arnold was cast as Lachie, Jenny's university friend, while Lara Robinson appeared in five episodes as student Tilly Young. Peta Sergeant started appearing as Sophie's friend, Cat Johnson, from August. Tom Hobbs also joined the main cast as Cat's brother Flynn. Brett Cousins began appearing from October 2012 as Tilly's father, Glenn.

Episodes

{| class="wikitable plainrowheaders" style="margin: auto; width: 100%"
|-
!! style="background-color:#FF5F5F; text-align: center;" width=5%|No. inseries
!! style="background-color:#FF5F5F; text-align: center;" width=5%|No. inseason
!! style="background-color:#FF5F5F; text-align: center;" width=25%|Title
!! style="background-color:#FF5F5F; text-align: center;" width=16%|Directed by
!! style="background-color:#FF5F5F; text-align: center;" width=28%|Written by
!! style="background-color:#FF5F5F; text-align: center;" width=14%|Original air date
!! style="background-color:#FF5F5F; text-align: center;" width=7%|Australian viewers
|-

|}

DVD release

Critical reception
The season debut did not impress Gordon Farrer from WAtoday, who wrote "welcome to season two of Winners & Losers [...] the acting is patchy, too many of the characters are tinny and the moral is ham-fisted." While Holly Richards from The West Australian said that the storyline surrounding the characters of Sophie, Doug, Bec and Matt was an "awkward situation" and overall "the first episode promises some interesting conflict to come".

Ian Cuthbertson from The Australian said that season two is "still centred on four women, defined as losers at school, who win a motza on Oz Lotto". He called it "soap as usual" and questioned why something "interesting" was not done with their winnings, such a living abroad. While Debi Enker of The Age said that the biggest problem in the series was the "relentlessly ham-fisted style". They fail to be subtle because "every potential issue" is predictable and "everything is restated to the point that you want to scream at the screen". Enker added that they had "tweaked" characters and added "new elements" for season two, but it still lacked confidence. She concluded that Winners & Losers needed to remove the soap-style close-ups and "tone down the caricatured aspects of its characters".

References

External links
 

2012 Australian television seasons